Dushimirimana Eric, better known by his stage name Spoks Man (born 15 April 1992), is a Burundian singer-songwriter, talk show host and news presenter at Best Entertainment Television in Bujumbura, Burundi.

Early life and education 
Spoks Man was born on April 15, 1992 in Bujumbura, the former capital of Burundi. He grew up in a Catholic family and spent most of his childhood in Bwiza, one of the most popular areas of Marie de Bujumbura, where he took his first steps in music. Influenced by the Congolese (formerly Zairian) musical group Makoma, composed of six siblings in 1993, Spoks Man started dancing for money on the streets and in cultural centers.<ref name="BIO">"Spoks man a réussi grâce à sa créativité", Publication de Presse Burundaise – PPB, December 21, 2016 (Retrieved July 15, 2020)</ref>

 Career 

In 2006, Spoks Man contacted record producer Jeremy Production, who offered him a place to work on his voice and rhythm, and who produced the songs "Warambaniye" and "Umwana" for him. Three years later, at the departure of Jerem Production, Spoks Man was bogged down in his music career. In the hope of finding a manager, he decided to advertise for national telecommunication companies, including two for Ucom in 2009 and one for Smart Communications in 2010.

In the studio of High Level Record in 2011, Spoks Man produced the song "Iherezo ryiza" and his video clip produced by Johnny B of Mira Mira Film. With several other Burundian artists, they collaborated on his song "Abamenyeshamakuru". In 2012, he became a disc jockey in his new studio, High Vision Studio, in a northern district of Bujumbura called Mutanga-Nord.

Passionate about music, Spoks Man produced the song "Ndatemutse" featuring with artists 19th and Dj Preeze 36, but it was of poor quality. The song was touched up in the studio High Level Record with Dj Goz before its official launch in June 2013. One month later, he produced the video clip for "Ndatemutse" again with Johnny B, which became a Burundian hit single and latter with his song "Burundi" won the 2013 Isanganiro Award, organized annually by Radio Isanganiro, created in 2002."Isanganiro Award 8eme Edition, Indirimbo 20 zamaze kumenyekana", BeTV (Burundi), February 20, 2020 (Retrieved July 15, 2020)

From 2014, Spoks Man produced several other songs, some of them in collaboration with other renowned Burundian artists. That August he recorded on the same song with Mkombozi, "Siko nabisanze"; it was even produced on the song "Nzobiki murikazoza" by Ayo Lizer, currently on the Tanzanian label WCB Wasafi alongside the multi-award bongo fleva artist Diamond Platnumz.

In 2017, he left his musical career to devote himself to a journalism career. Currently Spoks Man is presenter of Top10, B-News of the private television channel Best Entertainment Television (BeTV), headquartered in bujumbura."TOP10 : Ntivyoroshe !!! Tora indirimbo 10 zizosigara muri TOP10 murizi ndirimbo zirenga 40 / BE TV" BeTV (Burundi), July 13, 2020 (Retrieved July 15, 2020)

 Discography 
 Albums 
 Ndakumbuye Iwacu
 2017: Ndakumbuye iwacu 2017: Mwarihe? 2017: Amahera 2016: Celibataire ft. B-Face
 2016: Abamenyeshamakuru 2016: Iherez ryiza 2015: Utayaona 2014: Burundi 2014: Nzobiki muri kazoza 2013: Agakuku 2013: Ndatemutse ft. 19th
 2013: Siko nabisanze'' ft. Mkombozi

Singles 
 2015: "Ndi impunzi"
 2014: "Twoterimbere"
 2013: "Vyasosumo" ft. 19th, Dj Preeze 36
 2011: "Abamenyesha makuru" 
 2011: "Iherezo"
 2010: "Ndeganye" ft. Dj Dadddy
 2009: "Wmwana" ft. Nelly Merveille
 2009: "Warambaniye"

Awards and nominations 
 2013 : Isanganiro Awards winner, organized annually by Radio Isanganiro

References

External links 

Spoks Man on YouTube

1992 births
Living people
Burundian male singers
People from Bujumbura
Burundian journalists